"Rock 'n' Roll to the Rescue" is a song by American rock band the Beach Boys from their 1986 album Made in U.S.A. Written by Mike Love and Terry Melcher, it was released as a single on June 9, 1986 and reached number 68 on the U.S. Billboard pop singles chart.

Cash Box said that it "features the unforgettable vocal harmonies and fun-loving trademarks that have endeared the Beach Boys to audiences for all these years."  Billboard said "theme and beat date from their earliest days, vocal arrangements from their maturity."

Charts

References

Songs about rock music
The Beach Boys songs
1986 singles
Songs written by Mike Love
Songs written by Terry Melcher
Song recordings produced by Terry Melcher
Capitol Records singles